Chalmers Dancy Clifton (April 30, 1889, Jackson, Mississippi – June 19, 1966, New York City) was an American conductor and composer.  Born in Jackson, Mississippi, he wrote a number of orchestral works, and some chamber music as well.  He served on the jury deciding the Pulitzer Prize in Music for a number of years.  He was a founder and first musical director of the American Orchestral Society and during the 1920s, he helped young musicians in New York prepare for being in orchestras across the country.

References

External links

1889 births
1966 deaths
American male classical composers
American classical composers
Musicians from Jackson, Mississippi
American male conductors (music)
20th-century American composers
20th-century American conductors (music)
20th-century American male musicians
Classical musicians from Mississippi
20th-century classical composers